Nilüfer Belediyespor is a multi-sports club in the Nilüfer district of Bursa Province, Turkey. The club's most prominent sections are football, men's handball, and women's volleyball.

External links 

 
1999 establishments in Turkey